Zenas may refer to:

People with the given name
Zenas (Ζηνᾶς), an ancient Greek sculptor
Zenas Beach (1825–1898), American politician
Zenas Bliss (1835–1900), officer and general in the United States Army, recipient of the Medal of Honor
Zenas Coffin (1764–1828), American mariner and one of the wealthiest whale oil merchants and largest shipowners of his time in Nantucket, Massachusetts
Zenas Ferry Moody (1832–1917), the seventh Governor of Oregon from 1882 to 1887
Zenas H. Gurley, Sr. (1801–1871), leader in the Latter Day Saint movement
Rufus Zenas Johnston (1874–1959), awarded the Medal of Honor for actions at the U.S. occupation of Veracruz, 1914
Zenas King (born 1818), bridge-builder, founder of the King Iron Bridge & Manufacturing Company in 1871
Zenas Winsor McCay (–1934), cartoonist and animator
Zenas the Lawyer, one of the Seventy Disciples sent out by Jesus of Nazareth to spread his message

Places
Zenas, Indiana, unincorporated community in Columbia Township, Jennings County, Indiana, United States